Vashi (Washi) is a panchayat village in Pen Taluka, Raigad District, Maharashtra, India, on a distributary of the Bhogeshwar River that flows into the Amba River. Vashi is 7.7 km by road northwest of the village of Pen.

There are three villages in the gram panchayat: Vashi, Odhangi, and Sarebhag (N.V.).

Demographics
In the 2011 India census, Vashi had a population of 1,977.

Notes

Villages in Raigad district